This article lists events that occurred during 1951 in Estonia.

Incumbents
Johannes Käbin

Events
Estonian Agricultural Academy was found.

Births

Deaths

References

 
1950s in Estonia
Estonia
Estonia
Years of the 20th century in Estonia